Prymnesin may refer to:

 Prymnesin-1
 Prymnesin-2
 Prymnesin-B1
 Prymnesin-B2